Julio Maceiras Fauque (22 April 1926 - 6 September 2011)  was a Uruguayan football goalkeeper who played for Uruguay in the 1954 FIFA World Cup. He also played for Danubio F.C.

Career statistics

International

References

External links
 

1926 births
2011 deaths
Uruguayan footballers
Uruguay international footballers
Association football goalkeepers
Uruguayan Primera División players
Danubio F.C. players
1954 FIFA World Cup players
Copa América-winning players